The Commissioner of Education was the title given to the head of the federal Office of Education, which was historically a unit within and originally assigned to the Department of the Interior in the United States. The position was created on March 2, 1867, when an act to establish the Office of Education took effect under the influence of the more Radical Republican Party. They were influential mostly in the Northern states and New England, which were much more progressive in the fields of education and had already established many state departments of education. They also had a large number of public schools and systems in cities, towns and counties, both at the elementary (grammar) school and high school levels, in which the South had lagged behind.

The commissioner was the U.S. government's highest education official from after the Civil War and its reforming period of Reconstruction in 1867, until 1972, when the office of Assistant Secretary for Education was established within the independent Department of Health, Education and Welfare. The H.E.W. department had been earlier created as a cabinet-level department in April 1953, under President Harry Truman, continuing the previous advances created by the administration of Franklin D. Roosevelt and instigated under Dwight D. Eisenhower. Ultimately, the head of the federal government's nationwide educational efforts was reorganized with the separation and division of old H.E.W. into the new United States Department of Education in 1979 under President Jimmy Carter, with its own Cabinet-level position of the U.S. Secretary of Education.

Responsibilities
The commissioner was responsible for:
Formulating educational policy
Administering the various functions of the Office of Education
Coordinating educational activities at the national level

The commissioner also served as an ex officio member of the District of Columbia Commission on Licensure, the Board of Foreign Scholarships and served as the governmental representative on the U.S. National Commission for UNESCO (United Nations Educational, Scientific and Cultural Organization).

History
The independent federal Office of Education was created on March 2, 1867. It became part of the U.S. Department of the Interior on July 1, 1889. The office (also known later as the Bureau of Education) was included in the Interior Department's Federal Security Agency when it was established on July 1, 1939. The office was moved into the new U.S. Department of Health, Education and Welfare in April 1953, after Presidents Franklin D. Roosevelt and Harry Truman, accomplished shortly after the inauguration of Dwight D. Eisenhower 

In 1972, Public Law 92-318 provided the repeal of a part of the law which had created the office of Commissioner of Education. The repeal took effect on July 1, 1972. The Office of Education ceased to exist. Although the Assistant Secretary of Education then became the highest federal education position, the office of Commissioner of Education continued to exist within the new United States Department of Health, Education and Welfare until 1979, when the post was phased out due to the creation of the divided and reorganized new Department of Education which also was part of the President's Cabinet with its office of the U.S. Secretary of Education.

List of commissioners of education

References

United States Department of the Interior
United States Bureau of Education people